Lane is an unincorporated community in DeWitt County, Illinois, United States. The population was 95 as of the 2020 census.

Demographics
As of the 2020 census there were 95 people, and 26 families residing in the CDP. There were 47 housing units.

References

Unincorporated communities in DeWitt County, Illinois
Unincorporated communities in Illinois